Seamus Costello (1939 – 5 October 1977) was an Irish politician. He was a leader of Official Sinn Féin and the Official Irish Republican Army and latterly of the Irish Republican Socialist Party (IRSP) and the Irish National Liberation Army (INLA).

He argued for a combination of socialist politics on economic issues and traditional physical force Irish republicanism. He is best remembered for the founding of the IRSP and the INLA. He was a victim of a feud with his former comrades in the Official IRA.

Early life and IRA Border Campaign
Born into a middle-class family in Bray, County Wicklow, he was educated at Christian Brothers College, Monkstown Park. He left school at 15 and became a mechanic and later car salesman in Dublin.

At the age of 16 he joined Sinn Féin and the Irish Republican Army. Within a year, he was commanding an active service unit in south County Londonderry during the Border Campaign, where his leadership skills and burning down of the courthouse in Magherafelt earned him the nickname of "the Boy General". The unit's most publicised actions included the destruction of bridges.

He was arrested in Glencree, County Wicklow, in 1957 and sentenced to six months in Mountjoy Prison.  On his release, he was immediately interned in the Curragh prison camp for two years.

He spent his time in prison studying.  He was particularly inspired by his studies of the Vietnamese struggle for independence. He became a member of the escape committee which engineered the successful escapes of Ruairí Ó Brádaigh and Dáithí Ó Conaill, among others.  Costello would later refer to this time as his "university days".

Costello eventually reached the rank of Adjutant-General of the IRA. In 1964 Costello was sent to the recently opened Chinese embassy in Paris to seek assistance from the Chinese government.

Political activism
After his release, Costello worked to rebuild the republican movement, beginning by building a local base of support in County Wicklow as Sinn Féin's local organiser. Costello strongly supported the movement's left-wing orientation of these years, especially its emphasis on grassroots political activism. He helped found a strong tenants' association in Bray, and also became involved with the credit union movement and various farmers' organisations. During this period, he married a Tipperary woman, Maeliosa, who also became active in the republican movement. Costello was elected to both Bray Urban District Council and Wicklow County Council in 1966.

After the Troubles broke out in Northern Ireland in 1969, factions in both the IRA and Sinn Féin were divided over abstentionism and the left-wing faction's socialist politics.  The republican movement divided into Official and Provisional movements in 1969/70, but Costello remained with the Officials, owing to a greater commitment to left-wing politics.  He served as vice-president of Official Sinn Féin and as a staff officer in the Official IRA.

He was the Official IRA's Director of Operations.

Costello was opposed to the 1972 ceasefire and started to clash openly with the leadership, in particular Eoin Ó Murchú. Costello was subjected to court martial in 1974. Brigid Makowski, who was called to testify at his court martial in Mornington in County Meath, remarked that "Jesus could have testified on Costello's behalf and it wouldn't have changed the verdict." He was dismissed from OSF in 1974 after the OSF leadership blocked his supporters from attending the party convention.

He stood again in the 1974 local elections and topped the poll for the Wicklow County Council and the Bray Urban District Council.

Founds INLA and IRSP
At a meeting in the Lucan Spa Hotel near Dublin, on 8 December 1974, the Irish Republican Socialist Party was formed by republicans, socialists, and trade unionists with Costello as the chairperson.

At a private meeting later the same day, the Irish National Liberation Army was formed with Costello as the Chief of Staff, although its existence was to be kept secret for a time.  The new grouping intended to combine left-wing politics with the "armed struggle" against British security forces in Northern Ireland.

Within days of its founding, the fledgling Irish Republican Socialist Movement was embroiled in a bitter feud with the Official IRA. The feud resulted in the attempted assassination of Official IRA leader Sean Garland who was wounded in an INLA attack near his home in the Ballymun area of Dublin (Garland was wounded six times but survived the attack). Before a truce was reached, three members of the IRSP were dead.  Later that same year, Bernadette Devlin McAliskey resigned from the IRSP over the failure of a motion that would have brought the INLA under IRSP control, taking over half of the Ard Chomhairle members with her.

In July 1976 Costello was replaced as INLA chief-of-staff by South Londonderry man Eddy McNicholl, although he still wielded considerable influence within the movement, retaining his position as chairman of the IRSP.

Death
Despite the truce, Costello was shot dead with a shotgun as he sat in his car on Northbrook Avenue, off the North Strand Road in Dublin on 5 October 1977 allegedly by a member of the Official IRA, Jim Flynn, who happened to be in the area at the time. The Official and Provisional IRAs both denied responsibility and Sinn Féin/The Workers' Party issued a statement condemning the killing. Members of an opposing INLA faction in Belfast also denied the killing. However, the INLA eventually deemed Flynn the person responsible, and he was shot dead in June 1982 in the North Strand, Dublin, very close to the spot where Costello died.

Costello is the only leader of an Irish political party killed to date.

At the time of his death, he was a member of the following bodies:
 Wicklow County Council
 County Wicklow Committee of Agriculture
 General Council of Committees of Agriculture
 Eastern Regional Development Organisation
 National Museum Development Committee
 Bray Urban District Council
 Bray Branch of the Irish Transport and General Workers Union
 Bray and District Trade Unions Council (of which he was president 1976–77)
 Cualann Historical Society
as well as still holding the positions of
 Chairperson of the IRSP and
 Chief of Staff of the INLA.

His funeral was attended by Ruairí Ó Brádaigh, the then president of Sinn Féin, Michael O'Riordan of the Communist Party of Ireland, Bernadette McAliskey and local Wicklow TDs Liam Kavanagh (Labour), Ciarán Murphy (Fianna Fáil) and Godfrey Timmins (Fine Gael). At his funeral, former Senator Nora Connolly O'Brien, daughter of the Easter Rising leader James Connolly, gave the oration.
Of all the politicians and political people with whom I have had conversations and who called themselves followers of Connolly, he was the only one who truly understood what James Connolly meant when he spoke of his vision of the freedom of the Irish people.

Notes

References

 "Irish Republican Socialist Party"  Seamus Costello Tribute Page 6 October 2003, retrieved 5 January 2010.
 Political Biography and Tributes  13 August 2003, retrieved 5 January 2010.
 Profile at Electionsireland.com 

1939 births
1977 deaths
Deaths by firearm in the Republic of Ireland
Irish National Liberation Army members
Irish Republican Army (1922–1969) members
Irish Republican Socialist Party politicians
Irish republicans
Irish republicans interned without trial
Irish revolutionaries
Irish socialists
Official Irish Republican Army members
People from Bray, County Wicklow
People killed by the Official Irish Republican Army
People murdered in the Republic of Ireland
Politicians from County Wicklow
1977 murders in the Republic of Ireland
1977 murders in Europe
People educated at C.B.C. Monkstown